Jon Morris (born May 6, 1966) is an American retired ice hockey center who played in the National Hockey League (NHL) for the New Jersey Devils, San Jose Sharks, and Boston Bruins between 1988 and 1994. Internationally Morris played for the United States at the 1995 World Championships.

Career
Morris was chosen 86th overall by the New Jersey Devils in the 1984 NHL Draft after posting 81 points in 24 games for Chelmsford High School. He then spent four years at the University of Massachusetts Lowell, where he played for the UMass Lowell River Hawks men's ice hockey team. He was placed on the Hockey East first all-star team in 1987.
 After playing in four games with the Devils in 1988 and 1989, he returned to the AHL's Utica Devils and played in 20 games with New Jersey the following season. Morris was signed by the San Jose Sharks in March 1993, and the Boston Bruins acquired him in a trade that October. In 103 career NHL games from 1988–89 to 1993–94, he scored 16 goals and had 33 assists.

Career statistics

Regular season and playoffs

International

Awards and honors

References

1966 births
Living people
AHCA Division I men's ice hockey All-Americans
American men's ice hockey centers
Boston Bruins players
Chelmsford High School alumni
Cincinnati Cyclones players
EC Ratinger Löwen players
HC Gardena players
Ice hockey players from Massachusetts
Kansas City Blades players
New Jersey Devils draft picks
New Jersey Devils players
People from Chelmsford, Massachusetts
Providence Bruins players
Sportspeople from Middlesex County, Massachusetts
Sportspeople from Lowell, Massachusetts
San Jose Sharks players
UMass Lowell River Hawks men's ice hockey players
Utica Devils players